KICE (940 AM) was a commercial radio station in Bend, Oregon, broadcasting on 940 AM. The station shut down on March 31, 2017 (bearing for its final 8 days on air the KCOE call letters); its FCC license was deleted on March 12, 2019.

KICE history

KICE radio was originally (on 100.7 FM, now KMGX) a beautiful music station located in Bend, Oregon. Around 1980, in the height of the Urban Cowboy craze, KICE changed formats to 'Outlaw Country' playing such artists as: The Outlaws, New Riders of the Purple Sage, Willie and Waylon and Jerry Jeff Walker. KICE also included many traditional artists such as Patsy Cline, Merle Haggard and the Sons of the Pioneers at a time when most more commercial stations were playing more mainstream country acts.

Along with the unique country format, KICE touted an 'I'd rather be in Central Oregon' theme and concentrated on Central Oregon news and music events. KICE announcers were known as the 'Radio Rangers' who sponsored many country music events. Some best known KICE DJs were 'Rowdy Roy' Larson, 'Maverick Mark' Robbins, "Lightning Lady" Linda Evans, 'Magnum' Mike Slater, Matt James, Dallas Dobro, along with newsman R.L. Garrigus. KICE radio remained popular in the Central Oregon radio ratings until the station was sold in the late 1990s.

940 AM history
940 AM signed on the air July 22, 1959, as KGRL, a counterpart to KBOY in Medford, and aired a top 40 format in the 1970s. In 1994, the station changed its call letters to KXUX and aired an adult standards format. In 2000, it changed its call letters to KICE and began airing a sports format.

On March 23, 2017, the KICE call letters moved to 94.9 FM Terrebonne, formerly KCOE, which had been simulcasting 940 AM's Fox Sports Radio programming since going on the air in 2015. (The KCOE call letters were placed on 940.) The next day, citing the sale of its leased tower site, Sunriver Broadcast Corporation, which also leased out the station, replaced all programming on 940 AM with a loop inviting listeners to retune to 94.9, with the transmitter being shut off on March 31, 2017. On March 12, 2019, the FCC canceled the license for being silent more than a year.

References

External links
FCC Station Search Details: DKCOE (Facility ID: 49914)
FCC History Cards for KCOE (covering 1956-1981 as KGRL)

ICE (AM)
Radio stations established in 1959
1959 establishments in Oregon
Defunct radio stations in the United States
Radio stations disestablished in 2017
2017 disestablishments in Oregon
ICE